Edwin Freame Odell (2 December 1883 in Leicester – 11 March 1960) was an English cricketer. Odell was a left-handed batsman who bowled left-arm medium pace.

Odell made a single first-class appearance for Leicestershire against Northamptonshire in the 1912 County Championship at Aylestone Road, Leicester. In Leicestershire's first-innings of 96 all out, Odell was dismissed for a duck by Sydney Smith. In Northamptonshire's first-innings of 211/8 declared, Odell took the wickets of William East and Smith, finishing with figures of 2/42 from fourteen overs. Leicestershire reached 98/6 in their second-innings, with Odell not called upon to bat and the match ending as a draw.

He died at Northfield, Worcestershire on 11 March 1960. His brother William Odell also played first-class cricket. William was killed in action during the First World War.

References

External links
Edwin Odell at ESPNcricinfo
Edwin Odell at CricketArchive

1883 births
1960 deaths
Cricketers from Leicester
English cricketers
Leicestershire cricketers